The Turkey national under-18 and under-19 basketball team is the national representative for Turkey in men's international under-18 and under-19 basketball tournaments. They are formed and run by the Turkish Basketball Federation. The team competes at the FIBA U18 European Championship, with the opportunity to qualify for the FIBA Under-19 World Cup.

FIBA U18 European Championship

Squads
 2004 FIBA Europe Under-18 Championship — Silver Medal
 Caner Şentürk, Yasin Görlük, Semih Erden, Cenk Akyol, Murat Göktaş, Mehmet Yağmur, Polat Kaya, Oğuz Savaş, Engin Bayav, Cem Coşkun, Erhan Yetim and Hakan Demirel. Head coach:  Nihat İziç.
 2005 FIBA Europe Under-18 Championship — Silver Medal
 İsmet Hacıoğlu, Yasin Görlük, Caner Öner, Cenk Akyol, Murat Göktaş, Mehmet Yağmur, Can Altıntığ, Bora Paçun, Engin Bayav, Cemal Nalga, Erhan Yetim and Oğuz Savaş. Head coach:  Nihat İziç.
 2009 FIBA Europe Under-18 Championship — Bronze Medal
 Firat Töz, Cenk Şekeroğlu, Kevin Kaspar, Şafak Edge, Pertev Öngüner, Rıdvan Çalışkan, Maxim Mutaf, Burak Yüksel, Furkan Aldemir, Murat Erensoy, Enes Kanter and Aydin Okçu. Head coach:  Mustafa Derin.
 2011 FIBA Europe Under-18 Championship — Bronze Medal
 Kenan Sipahi, Erbil Eroğlu, Berkay Candan, Mertcan Özen, Uğur Dokuyan, Samet Geyik, Buğrahan Tuncer, Metin Türen, Onur Çalban, Talat Altunbey, Ramazan Tekin and Tayfun Erülkü. Head coach:  Erhan Toker.
 2013 FIBA Europe Under-18 Championship — Gold Medal
 Kenan Sipahi, Berk Uğurlu, Cedi Osman, Oğulcan Baykan, Metecan Birsen, Emircan Koşut, Egemen Güven, Kartal Özmızrak, Berk Demir, Okben Ulubay, Kerem Kanter and Doğukan Şanlı. Head coach:  Taner Günay.
 2014 FIBA Europe Under-18 Championship — Gold Medal
 Kadir Bayram, Berk Uğurlu, Doğuş Özdemiroğlu, Yiğit Arslan, Tolga Geçim, Oğulcan Baykan, Furkan Korkmaz, Ege Arar, Ayberk Olmaz, Okben Ulubay, Metehan Akyel, Egemen Güven. Head coach:  Ömer Uğurata
 2015 FIBA Europe Under-18 Championship — Silver Medal
Ömer Al, Erkan Yılmaz, Rıdvan Öncel, Enes Taşkıran, Barış Ülker, Arber Berisha, Furkan Korkmaz, Berkan Durmaz, Erten Gazi, Ercan Bayrak, Ömer Yurtseven, Mümin Tunç. Head coach:  Mustafa Derin
 2019 FIBA Europe Under-18 Championship — Silver Medal
Ömer Ilyasoğlu, Boran Güler, Tibet Görener, Ömer Küçük, Berkan Aksu, Mustafa Kurtuldum, Atakan Erdek, Alperen Şengün, Furkan Haltalı, Göktuğ Baş, Tarık Sezgün, Adem Bona. Head coach:  Derviş Gökhan Güney

FIBA Under-19 World Cup

Squads
 2015 FIBA U19 World Cup — Bronze Medal
 Kadir Bayram, Berk Uğurlu, Doğuş Özdemiroğlu, Yiğit Arslan, Tolga Geçim, Oğulcan Baykan, Furkan Korkmaz, Ege Arar, Ayberk Olmaz, Okben Ulubay, Mehmet Alemdaroğlu, Egemen Güven (C), Head coach:  Ömer Uğurata

See also
Turkey men's national under-20 basketball team
Turkey men's national under-16 and under-17 basketball team
Turkey men's national basketball team

References

External links
Official website 
FIBA profile

Men's U18 U19
 
Men's national under-18 basketball teams
Men's national under-19 basketball teams